Arthur Elliott (born 1870) was an English footballer who played in the Football League for Accrington and Woolwich Arsenal. He started his career playing for Notts Rangers and Gainsborough Trinity before joining Accrington. He played as an inside forward for Arsenal and scored 10 goals. He also joined Tottenham Hotspur in 1894, but played only one game for them in a friendly, as he decided to return to Nottingham and joined Nottingham Forest the same year.

References

1870 births
Date of death unknown
English footballers
English Football League players
Notts Rangers F.C. players
Gainsborough Trinity F.C. players
Accrington F.C. players
Arsenal F.C. players
Tottenham Hotspur F.C. players
Association football forwards